Marc Chagall (born Moishe Shagal; 28 March 1985) was a Russian-French artist. An early modernist, he was associated with several major artistic styles and created works in a wide range of artistic formats, including painting, drawings, book illustrations, stained glass, stage sets, ceramics, tapestries and fine art prints.

Chagall was born in 1887 into a Jewish family near Vitebsk, today in Belarus, but at the time in the Pale of Settlement of the Russian Empire. Before World War I, he travelled between Saint Petersburg, Paris, and Berlin. During this period he created his own mixture and style of modern art based on his idea of Eastern Europe and Jewish folk culture. He spent the wartime years in his native Belarus, becoming one of the country's most distinguished artists and a member of the modernist avant-garde, founding the Vitebsk Arts College. He later worked in and near Moscow in difficult conditions in a tough time in Russia, before leaving again for Paris in 1923. During World War II, he escaped occupied France to the United States, where he lived for 7 years in New York City before returning to France in 1948.

Art critic Robert Hughes referred to Chagall as "the quintessential Jewish artist of the twentieth century". According to art historian Michael J. Lewis, Chagall was considered to be "the last survivor of the first generation of European modernists". For decades, he "had also been respected as the world's pre-eminent Jewish artist". Using the medium of stained glass, he produced windows for the cathedrals of Reims and Metz as well as the Fraumünster in Zürich, windows for the UN and the Art Institute of Chicago and the Jerusalem Windows in Israel. He also did large-scale paintings, including part of the ceiling of the Paris Opéra.

He had two basic reputations, writes Lewis: as a pioneer of modernism and as a major Jewish artist. He experienced modernism's "golden age" in Paris, where "he synthesized the art forms of Cubism, Symbolism, and Fauvism, and the influence of Fauvism gave rise to Surrealism". Yet throughout these phases of his style "he remained most emphatically a Jewish artist, whose work was one long dreamy reverie of life in his native village of Vitebsk." "When Matisse dies," Pablo Picasso remarked in the 1950s, "Chagall will be the only painter left who understands what colour really is".

Early life and education

Early life

Marc Chagall was born Moishe Shagal in a Jewish family in Liozna, near the city of Vitebsk (Belarus, then part of the Russian Empire) in 1887. At the time of his birth, Vitebsk's population was about 66,000. Half of the population were Jewish. A picturesque city of churches and synagogues, it was called "Russian Toledo" by artist Ilya Repin, after the cosmopolitan city of the former Spanish Empire. As the city was built mostly of wood, little of it survived years of occupation and destruction during World War II.

Chagall was the eldest of nine children. The family name, Shagal, is a variant of the name Segal, which in a Jewish community was usually borne by a Levitic family. His father, Khatskl (Zachar) Shagal, was employed by a herring merchant, and his mother, Feige-Ite, sold groceries from their home. His father worked hard, carrying heavy barrels but earning only 20 roubles each month (the average wages across the Russian Empire was 13 roubles a month). Chagall would later include fish motifs "out of respect for his father", writes Chagall biographer, Jacob Baal-Teshuva. Chagall wrote of these early years:

One of the main sources of income of the Jewish population of the town was from the manufacture of clothing that was sold throughout the Russian Empire. They also made furniture and various agricultural tools. From the late 18th century to the First World War, the Imperial Russian government confined Jews to living within the Pale of Settlement, which included modern Ukraine, Belarus, Poland, Lithuania, and Latvia, almost exactly corresponding to the territory of the Polish-Lithuanian Commonwealth recently taken over by Imperial Russia. This caused the creation of Jewish market-villages (shtetls) throughout today's Eastern Europe, with their own markets, schools, hospitals, and other community institutions.

Chagall wrote as a boy; "I felt at every step that I was a Jew—people made me feel it". During a pogrom, Chagall wrote that: "The street lamps are out. I feel panicky, especially in front of butchers' windows. There you can see calves that are still alive lying beside the butchers' hatchets and knives". When asked by some pogromniks "Jew or not?", Chagall remembered thinking: "My pockets are empty, my fingers sensitive, my legs weak and they are out for blood. My death would be futile. I so wanted to live". Chagall denied being a Jew, leading the pogromniks to shout "All right! Get along!"

Most of what is known about Chagall's early life has come from his autobiography, My Life. In it, he described the major influence that the culture of Hasidic Judaism had on his life as an artist. Chagall related how he realised that the Jewish traditions in which he had grown up were fast disappearing and that he needed to document them. Vitebsk itself had been a centre of that culture dating from the 1730s with its teachings derived from the Kabbalah. Chagall scholar Susan Tumarkin Goodman describes the links and sources of his art to his early home:

Art education

In the Russian Empire at that time, Jewish children were not allowed to attend regular schools or universities. Their movement within the city was also restricted. Chagall therefore received his primary education at the local Jewish religious school, where he studied Hebrew and the Bible. At the age of 13, his mother tried to enroll him in a regular high school, and he recalled, "But in that school, they don't take Jews. Without a moment's hesitation, my courageous mother walks up to a professor." She offered the headmaster 50 roubles to let him attend, which he accepted.

A turning point of his artistic life came when he first noticed a fellow student drawing. Baal-Teshuva writes that for the young Chagall, watching someone draw "was like a vision, a revelation in black and white". Chagall would later say that there was no art of any kind in his family's home and the concept was totally alien to him. When Chagall asked the schoolmate how he learned to draw, his friend replied, "Go and find a book in the library, idiot, choose any picture you like, and just copy it". He soon began copying images from books and found the experience so rewarding he then decided he wanted to become an artist.

He eventually confided to his mother, "I want to be a painter", although she could not yet understand his sudden interest in art or why he would choose a vocation that "seemed so impractical", writes Goodman. The young Chagall explained, "There's a place in town; if I'm admitted and if I complete the course, I'll come out a regular artist. I'd be so happy!" It was 1906, and he had noticed the studio of Yehuda (Yuri) Pen, a realist artist who operated a drawing school in Vitebsk; at the same time, future artists El Lissitzky and Ossip Zadkine were also Pen's students. Due to Chagall's youth and lack of income, Pen offered to teach him free of charge. However, after a few months at the school, Chagall realized that academic portrait painting did not suit his desires.

Artistic inspiration

Goodman notes that during this period in Imperial Russia, Jews had two ways for joining the art world: one was to "hide or deny one's Jewish roots", the other—the one that Chagall chose—was "to cherish and publicly express one's Jewish roots" by integrating them into art. For Chagall, this was also his means of "self-assertion and an expression of principle."

Chagall biographer Franz Meyer explains that with the connections between his art and early life "the hassidic spirit is still the basis and source of nourishment for his art." Lewis adds, "As cosmopolitan an artist as he would later become, his storehouse of visual imagery would never expand beyond the landscape of his childhood, with its snowy streets, wooden houses, and ubiquitous fiddlers... [with] scenes of childhood so indelibly in one's mind and to invest them with an emotional charge so intense that it could only be discharged obliquely through an obsessive repetition of the same cryptic symbols and ideograms... "

Years later, at the age of 57 while living in the United States, Chagall confirmed this when he published an open letter entitled, "To My City Vitebsk":

Why? Why did I leave you many years ago? ... You thought, the boy seeks something, seeks such a special subtlety, that color descending like stars from the sky and landing, bright and transparent, like snow on our roofs. Where did he get it? How would it come to a boy like him? I don't know why he couldn't find it with us, in the city—in his homeland. Maybe the boy is "crazy", but "crazy" for the sake of art. ...You thought: "I can see, I am etched in the boy's heart, but he is still 'flying,' he is still striving to take off, he has 'wind' in his head." ... I did not live with you, but I didn't have one single painting that didn't breathe with your spirit and reflection.

Art career

Russian Empire (1906–1910)
In 1906, he moved to Saint Petersburg, which was then the capital of the Russian Empire and the center of the country's artistic life with its famous art schools. Since Jews were not permitted into the city without an internal passport, he managed to get a temporary passport from a friend. He enrolled in a prestigious art school and studied there for two years. By 1907, he had begun painting naturalistic self-portraits and landscapes. Chagall was an active member of the irregular freemasonic lodge, the Grand Orient of Russia's Peoples. He belonged to the "Vitebsk" lodge.

Between 1908 and 1910, Chagall was a student of Léon Bakst at the Zvantseva School of Drawing and Painting. While in Saint Petersburg, he discovered experimental theater and the work of such artists as Paul Gauguin. Bakst, also Jewish, was a designer of decorative art and was famous as a draftsman designer of stage sets and costumes for the Ballets Russes, and helped Chagall by acting as a role model for Jewish success. Bakst moved to Paris a year later. Art historian Raymond Cogniat writes that after living and studying art on his own for four years, "Chagall entered into the mainstream of contemporary art. ...His apprenticeship over, Russia had played a memorable initial role in his life."

Chagall stayed in Saint Petersburg until 1910, often visiting Vitebsk where he met Bella Rosenfeld. In My Life, Chagall described his first meeting her: "Her silence is mine, her eyes mine. It is as if she knows everything about my childhood, my present, my future, as if she can see right through me." Bella later wrote, of meeting him, "When you did catch a glimpse of his eyes, they were as blue as if they'd fallen straight out of the sky. They were strange eyes … long, almond-shaped … and each seemed to sail along by itself, like a little boat."

France (1910–1914)

In 1910, Chagall relocated to Paris to develop his artistic style. Art historian and curator James Sweeney notes that when Chagall first arrived in Paris, Cubism was the dominant art form, and French art was still dominated by the "materialistic outlook of the 19th century". But Chagall arrived from Russia with "a ripe color gift, a fresh, unashamed response to sentiment, a feeling for simple poetry and a sense of humor", he adds. These notions were alien to Paris at that time, and as a result, his first recognition came not from other painters but from poets such as Blaise Cendrars and Guillaume Apollinaire. Art historian Jean Leymarie observes that Chagall began thinking of art as "emerging from the internal being outward, from the seen object to the psychic outpouring", which was the reverse of the Cubist way of creating.

He therefore developed friendships with Guillaume Apollinaire and other avant-garde artists including Robert Delaunay and Fernand Léger. Baal-Teshuva writes that "Chagall's dream of Paris, the city of light and above all, of freedom, had come true." His first days were a hardship for the 23-year-old Chagall, who was lonely in the big city and unable to speak French. Some days he "felt like fleeing back to Russia, as he daydreamed while he painted, about the riches of Slavic folklore, his Hasidic experiences, his family, and especially Bella".

In Paris, he enrolled at Académie de La Palette, an avant-garde school of art where the painters Jean Metzinger, André Dunoyer de Segonzac and Henri Le Fauconnier taught, and also found work at another academy. He would spend his free hours visiting galleries and salons, especially the Louvre; artists he came to admire included Rembrandt, the Le Nain brothers, Chardin, van Gogh, Renoir, Pissarro, Matisse, Gauguin, Courbet, Millet, Manet, Monet, Delacroix, and others. It was in Paris that he learned the technique of gouache, which he used to paint Belarusian scenes. He also visited Montmartre and the Latin Quarter "and was happy just breathing Parisian air."
Baal-Teshuva describes this new phase in Chagall's artistic development:

During his time in Paris, Chagall was constantly reminded of his home in Vitebsk, as Paris was also home to many painters, writers, poets, composers, dancers, and other émigrés from the Russian Empire. However, "night after night he painted until dawn", only then going to bed for a few hours, and resisted the many temptations of the big city at night. "My homeland exists only in my soul", he once said. He continued painting Jewish motifs and subjects from his memories of Vitebsk, although he included Parisian scenes—- the Eiffel Tower in particular, along with portraits. Many of his works were updated versions of paintings he had made in Russia, transposed into Fauvist or Cubist keys.

Chagall developed a whole repertoire of quirky motifs: ghostly figures floating in the sky, ... the gigantic fiddler dancing on miniature dollhouses, the livestock and transparent wombs and, within them, tiny offspring sleeping upside down. The majority of his scenes of life in Vitebsk were painted while living in Paris, and "in a sense they were dreams", notes Lewis. Their "undertone of yearning and loss", with a detached and abstract appearance, caused Apollinaire to be "struck by this quality", calling them "surnaturel!" His "animal/human hybrids and airborne phantoms" would later become a formative influence on Surrealism. Chagall, however, did not want his work to be associated with any school or movement and considered his own personal language of symbols to be meaningful to himself. But Sweeney notes that others often still associate his work with "illogical and fantastic painting", especially when he uses "curious representational juxtapositions".

Sweeney writes that "This is Chagall's contribution to contemporary art: the reawakening of a poetry of representation, avoiding factual illustration on the one hand, and non-figurative abstractions on the other". André Breton said that "with him alone, the metaphor made its triumphant return to modern painting".

Russia (1914–1922)
Because he missed his fiancée, Bella, who was still in Vitebsk—"He thought about her day and night", writes Baal-Teshuva—and was afraid of losing her, Chagall decided to accept an invitation from a noted art dealer in Berlin to exhibit his work, his intention being to continue on to Belarus, marry Bella, and then return with her to Paris. Chagall took 40 canvases and 160 gouaches, watercolors and drawings to be exhibited. The exhibit, held at Herwarth Walden's Sturm Gallery was a huge success, "The German critics positively sang his praises."

After the exhibit, he continued on to Vitebsk, where he planned to stay only long enough to marry Bella. However, after a few weeks, the First World War began, closing the Russian border for an indefinite period. A year later he married Bella Rosenfeld and they had their first child, Ida. Before the marriage, Chagall had difficulty convincing Bella's parents that he would be a suitable husband for their daughter. They were worried about her marrying a painter from a poor family and wondered how he would support her. Becoming a successful artist now became a goal and inspiration. According to Lewis, "[T]he euphoric paintings of this time, which show the young couple floating balloon-like over Vitebsk—its wooden buildings faceted in the Delaunay manner—are the most lighthearted of his career". His wedding pictures were also a subject he would return to in later years as he thought about this period of his life.

In 1915, Chagall began exhibiting his work in Moscow, first exhibiting his works at a well-known salon and in 1916 exhibiting pictures in St. Petersburg. He again showed his art at a Moscow exhibition of avant-garde artists. This exposure brought recognition, and a number of wealthy collectors began buying his art. He also began illustrating a number of Yiddish books with ink drawings. He illustrated I. L. Peretz's The Magician in 1917. Chagall was 30 years old and had begun to become well known.

The October Revolution of 1917 was a dangerous time for Chagall although it also offered opportunity. Chagall wrote he came to fear Bolshevik orders pinned on fences, writing: "The factories were stopping. The horizons opened. Space and emptiness. No more bread. The black lettering on the morning posters made me feel sick at heart". Chagall was often hungry for days, later remembering watching "a bride, the beggars and the poor wretches weighted down with bundles", leading him to conclude that the new regime had turned the Russian Empire "upside down the way I turn my pictures". By then he was one of Imperial Russia's most distinguished artists and a member of the modernist avant-garde, which enjoyed special privileges and prestige as the "aesthetic arm of the revolution". He was offered a notable position as a commissar of visual arts for the country, but preferred something less political, and instead accepted a job as commissar of arts for Vitebsk. This resulted in his founding the Vitebsk Arts College which, adds Lewis, became the "most distinguished school of art in the Soviet Union".

It obtained for its faculty some of the most important artists in the country, such as El Lissitzky and Kazimir Malevich. He also added his first teacher, Yehuda Pen. Chagall tried to create an atmosphere of a collective of independently minded artists, each with their own unique style. However, this would soon prove to be difficult as a few of the key faculty members preferred a Suprematist art of squares and circles, and disapproved of Chagall's attempt at creating "bourgeois individualism". Chagall then resigned as commissar and moved to Moscow.

In Moscow he was offered a job as stage designer for the newly formed State Jewish Chamber Theater. It was set to begin operation in early 1921 with a number of plays by Sholem Aleichem. For its opening he created a number of large background murals using techniques he learned from Bakst, his early teacher. One critic at the time called it "Hebrew jazz in paint". Chagall created it as a "storehouse of symbols and devices", notes Lewis. The murals "constituted a landmark" in the history of the theatre, and were forerunners of his later large-scale works, including murals for the New York Metropolitan Opera and the Paris Opera.

The First World War ended in 1918, but the Russian Civil War continued, and famine spread. The Chagalls found it necessary to move to a smaller, less expensive, town near Moscow, although Chagall now had to commute to Moscow daily, using crowded trains. In 1921, he worked as an art teacher along with his friend sculptor Isaac Itkind in a Jewish boys' shelter in suburban Malakhovka, which housed young refugees orphaned by pogroms. While there, he created a series of illustrations for the Yiddish poetry cycle Grief written by David Hofstein, who was another teacher at the Malakhovka shelter.

After spending the years between 1921 and 1922 living in primitive conditions, he decided to go back to France so that he could develop his art in a more comfortable country. Numerous other artists, writers, and musicians were also planning to relocate to the West. He applied for an exit visa and while waiting for its uncertain approval, wrote his autobiography, My Life.

France (1923–1941)
In 1923, Chagall left Moscow to return to France. On his way he stopped in Berlin to recover the many pictures he had left there on exhibit ten years earlier, before the war began, but was unable to find or recover any of them. Nonetheless, after returning to Paris he again "rediscovered the free expansion and fulfillment which were so essential to him", writes Lewis. With all his early works now lost, he began trying to paint from his memories of his earliest years in Vitebsk with sketches and oil paintings.

He formed a business relationship with French art dealer Ambroise Vollard. This inspired him to begin creating etchings for a series of illustrated books, including Gogol's Dead Souls, the Bible, and the La Fontaine's Fables. These illustrations would eventually come to represent his finest printmaking efforts. In 1924, he travelled to Brittany and painted La fenêtre sur l'Île-de-Bréhat. By 1926 he had his first exhibition in the United States at the Reinhardt gallery of New York which included about 100 works, although he did not travel to the opening. He instead stayed in France, "painting ceaselessly", notes Baal-Teshuva. It was not until 1927 that Chagall made his name in the French art world, when art critic and historian Maurice Raynal awarded him a place in his book Modern French Painters. However, Raynal was still at a loss to accurately describe Chagall to his readers:

During this period he traveled throughout France and the Côte d'Azur, where he enjoyed the landscapes, colorful vegetation, the blue Mediterranean Sea, and the mild weather. He made repeated trips to the countryside, taking his sketchbook. He also visited nearby countries and later wrote about the impressions some of those travels left on him:

The Bible illustrations

After returning to Paris from one of his trips, Vollard commissioned Chagall to illustrate the Old Testament. Although he could have completed the project in France, he used the assignment as an excuse to travel to Israel to experience for himself the Holy Land. In 1931 Marc Chagall and his family traveled to Tel Aviv on the invitation of Meir Dizengoff. Dizengoff had previously encouraged Chagall to visit Tel Aviv in connection with Dizengoff's plan to build a Jewish Art Museum in the new city. Chagall and his family were invited to stay at Dizengoff's house in Tel Aviv, which later became Independence Hall of the State of Israel.

Chagall ended up staying in the Holy Land for two months. Chagall felt at home in Israel where many people spoke Yiddish and Russian. According to Jacob Baal-Teshuva, "he was impressed by the pioneering spirit of the people in the kibbutzim and deeply moved by the Wailing Wall and the other holy places".

Chagall later told a friend that Israel gave him "the most vivid impression he had ever received". Wullschlager notes, however, that whereas Delacroix and Matisse had found inspiration in the exoticism of North Africa, he as a Jew in Israel had different perspective. "What he was really searching for there was not external stimulus but an inner authorization from the land of his ancestors, to plunge into his work on the Bible illustrations". Chagall stated that "In the East I found the Bible and part of my own being."

As a result, he immersed himself in "the history of the Jews, their trials, prophecies, and disasters", notes Wullschlager. She adds that beginning the assignment was an "extraordinary risk" for Chagall, as he had finally become well known as a leading contemporary painter, but would now end his modernist themes and delve into "an ancient past". Between 1931 and 1934 he worked "obsessively" on "The Bible", even going to Amsterdam in order to carefully study the biblical paintings of Rembrandt and El Greco, to see the extremes of religious painting. He walked the streets of the city's Jewish quarter to again feel the earlier atmosphere. He told Franz Meyer:

Chagall saw the Old Testament as a "human story, ... not with the creation of the cosmos but with the creation of man, and his figures of angels are rhymed or combined with human ones", writes Wullschlager. She points out that in one of his early Bible images, "Abraham and the Three Angels", the angels sit and chat over a glass of wine "as if they have just dropped by for dinner".

He returned to France and by the next year had completed 32 out of the total of 105 plates. By 1939, at the beginning of World War II, he had finished 66. However, Vollard died that same year. When the series was completed in 1956, it was published by Edition Tériade. Baal-Teshuva writes that "the illustrations were stunning and met with great acclaim. Once again Chagall had shown himself to be one of the 20th century's most important graphic artists". Leymarie has described these drawings by Chagall as "monumental" and,

Nazi campaigns against modern art
Not long after Chagall began his work on the Bible, Adolf Hitler gained power in Germany. Anti-Semitic laws were being introduced and the first concentration camp at Dachau had been established. Wullschlager describes the early effects on art:

Beginning during 1937 about twenty thousand works from German museums were confiscated as "degenerate" by a committee directed by Joseph Goebbels. Although the German press had once "swooned over him", the new German authorities now made a mockery of Chagall's art, describing them as "green, purple, and red Jews shooting out of the earth, fiddling on violins, flying through the air ... representing [an] assault on Western civilization".

After Germany invaded and occupied France, the Chagalls remained in Vichy France, unaware that French Jews, with the help of the Vichy government, were being collected and sent to German concentration camps, from which few would return. The Vichy collaborationist government, directed by Marshal Philippe Pétain, immediately upon assuming power established a commission to "redefine French citizenship" with the aim of stripping "undesirables", including naturalized citizens, of their French nationality. Chagall had been so involved with his art, that it was not until October 1940, after the Vichy government, at the behest of the Nazi occupying forces, began approving anti-Semitic laws, that he began to understand what was happening. Learning that Jews were being removed from public and academic positions, the Chagalls finally "woke up to the danger they faced". But Wullschlager notes that "by then they were trapped". Their only refuge could be America, but "they could not afford the passage to New York" or the large bond that each immigrant had to provide upon entry to ensure that they would not become a financial burden to the country.

Escaping occupied France
According to Wullschlager, "[T]he speed with which France collapsed astonished everyone: the [British supported French army] capitulated even more quickly than Poland had done" a year earlier. Shock waves crossed the Atlantic... as Paris had until then been equated with civilization throughout the non-Nazi world." Yet the attachment of the Chagalls to France "blinded them to the urgency of the situation." Many other well-known Russian and Jewish artists eventually sought to escape: these included Chaïm Soutine, Max Ernst, Max Beckmann, Ludwig Fulda, author Victor Serge and prize-winning author Vladimir Nabokov, who although not Jewish himself, was married to a Jewish woman. Russian author Victor Serge described many of the people living temporarily in Marseille who were waiting to emigrate to America:

After prodding by their daughter Ida, who "perceived the need to act fast", and with help from Alfred Barr of the New York Museum of Modern Art, Chagall was saved by having his name added to the list of prominent artists whose lives were at risk and who the United States should try to extricate. Varian Fry, the American journalist, and Hiram Bingham IV, the American Vice-Consul in Marseilles, ran a rescue operation to smuggle artists and intellectuals out of Europe to the US by providing them with forged visas to the US. In April 1941, Chagall and his wife were stripped of their French citizenship. The Chagalls stayed in a hotel in Marseille where they were arrested along with other Jews. Varian Fry managed to pressure the French police to release him, threatening them of scandal. Chagall was one of over 2,000 who were rescued by this operation. He left France in May 1941, "when it was almost too late", adds Lewis. Picasso and Matisse were also invited to come to America but they decided to remain in France. Chagall and Bella arrived in New York on 23 June 1941, the day after Germany invaded the Soviet Union. Ida and her husband Michel followed on the notorious refugee ship SS Navemar with a large case of Chagall's work. A chance post-war meeting in a French café between Ida and intelligence analyst Konrad Kellen led to Kellen carrying more paintings on his return to the United States.

United States (1941–1948)

Even before arriving in the United States in 1941, Chagall was awarded the Carnegie Prize third prize in 1939 for "Les Fiancés". After being in America he discovered that he had already achieved "international stature", writes Cogniat, although he felt ill-suited in this new role in a foreign country whose language he could not yet speak. He became a celebrity mostly against his will, feeling lost in the strange surroundings.

After a while he began to settle in New York, which was full of writers, painters, and composers who, like himself, had fled from Europe during the Nazi invasions. He lived at 4 East 74th Street. He spent time visiting galleries and museums, and befriended other artists including Piet Mondrian and André Breton.

Baal-Teshuva writes that Chagall "loved" going to the sections of New York where Jews lived, especially the Lower East Side. There he felt at home, enjoying the Jewish foods and being able to read the Yiddish press, which became his main source of information since he did not yet speak English.

Contemporary artists did not yet understand or even like Chagall's art. According to Baal-Teshuva, "they had little in common with a folkloristic storyteller of Russo-Jewish extraction with a propensity for mysticism." The Paris School, which was referred to as 'Parisian Surrealism,' meant little to them. Those attitudes would begin to change, however, when Pierre Matisse, the son of recognized French artist Henri Matisse, became his representative and managed Chagall exhibitions in New York and Chicago in 1941. One of the earliest exhibitions included 21 of his masterpieces from 1910 to 1941. Art critic Henry McBride wrote about this exhibit for the New York Sun:

Aleko ballet (1942)
He was offered a commission by choreographer Léonide Massine of the Ballet Theatre of New York to design the sets and costumes for his new ballet, Aleko. This ballet would stage the words of Alexander Pushkin's verse narrative The Gypsies with the music of Tchaikovsky. The ballet was originally planned for a New York debut, but as a cost-saving measure it was moved to Mexico where labor costs were cheaper than in New York. While Chagall had done stage settings before while in Russia, this was his first ballet, and it would give him the opportunity to visit Mexico. While there he quickly began to appreciate the "primitive ways and colorful art of the Mexicans," notes Cogniat. He found "something very closely related to his own nature", and did all the color detail for the sets while there. Eventually, he created four large backdrops and had Mexican seamstresses sew the ballet costumes.

When the ballet premiered at the Palacio de Bellas Artes in Mexico City on 8 September 1942 it was considered a "remarkable success." In the audience were other famous mural painters who came to see Chagall's work, including Diego Rivera and José Clemente Orozco. According to Baal-Teshuva, when the final bar of music ended, "there was a tumultuous applause and 19 curtain calls, with Chagall himself being called back onto the stage again and again." The production then moved to New York, where it was presented four weeks later at the Metropolitan Opera and the response was repeated, "again Chagall was the hero of the evening". Art critic Edwin Denby wrote of the opening for the New York Herald Tribune that Chagall's work:

Coming to grips with World War II
After Chagall returned to New York in 1943 current events began to interest him more, and this was represented by his art, where he painted subjects including the Crucifixion and scenes of war. He learned that the Germans had destroyed the town where he was raised, Vitebsk, and became greatly distressed. He also learned about the Nazi concentration camps. During a speech in February 1944, he described some of his feelings:

In the same speech he credited Soviet Russia with doing the most to save the Jews:

On 2 September 1944, Bella died suddenly due to a virus infection, which was not treated due to the wartime shortage of medicine. As a result, he stopped all work for many months, and when he did resume painting his first pictures were concerned with preserving Bella's memory. Wullschlager writes of the effect on Chagall: "As news poured in through 1945 of the ongoing Holocaust at Nazi concentration camps, Bella took her place in Chagall's mind with the millions of Jewish victims." He even considered the possibility that their "exile from Europe had sapped her will to live."

After a year of living with his daughter Ida and her husband Michel Gordey, he entered into a romance with Virginia Haggard, daughter of diplomat Sir Godfrey Digby Napier Haggard and great-niece of the author Sir Henry Rider Haggard; their relationship endured seven years. They had a child together, David McNeil, born 22 June 1946. Haggard recalled her "seven years of plenty" with Chagall in her book, My Life with Chagall (Robert Hale, 1986).

A few months after the Allies succeeded in liberating Paris from Nazi occupation, with the help of the Allied armies, Chagall published a letter in a Paris weekly, "To the Paris Artists":

Post-war years
By 1946, his artwork was becoming more widely recognized. The Museum of Modern Art in New York had a large exhibition representing 40 years of his work which gave visitors one of the first complete impressions of the changing nature of his art over the years. The war had ended and he began making plans to return to Paris. According to Cogniat, "He found he was even more deeply attached than before, not only to the atmosphere of Paris, but to the city itself, to its houses and its views." Chagall summed up his years living in America:

He went back for good during the autumn of 1947, where he attended the opening of the exhibition of his works at the Musée National d'Art Moderne.

France (1948–1985)
After returning to France he traveled throughout Europe and chose to live in the Côte d'Azur which by that time had become somewhat of an "artistic centre". Matisse lived near Saint-Paul-de-Vence, about seven miles west of Nice, while Picasso lived in Vallauris. Although they lived nearby and sometimes worked together, there was artistic rivalry between them as their work was so distinctly different, and they never became long-term friends. According to Picasso's mistress, Françoise Gilot, Picasso still had a great deal of respect for Chagall, and once told her,

In April 1952, Virginia Haggard left Chagall for the photographer Charles Leirens; she went on to become a professional photographer herself.

Chagall's daughter Ida married art historian Franz Meyer in January 1952, and feeling that her father missed the companionship of a woman in his home, introduced him to Valentina (Vava) Brodsky, a woman from a similar Russian Jewish background, who had run a successful millinery business in London. She became his secretary, and after a few months agreed to stay only if Chagall married her. The marriage took place in July 1952—though six years later, when there was conflict between Ida and Vava, "Marc and Vava divorced and immediately remarried under an agreement more favourable to Vava" (Jean-Paul Crespelle, author of Chagall, l'Amour le Reve et la Vie, quoted in Haggard: My Life with Chagall).

In 1954, he was engaged as set decorator for Robert Helpmann's production of Rimsky-Korsakov's opera Le Coq d'Or at the Royal Opera House, Covent Garden, but he withdrew. The Australian designer Loudon Sainthill was drafted at short notice in his place.

In the years ahead he was able to produce not just paintings and graphic art, but also numerous sculptures and ceramics, including wall tiles, painted vases, plates and jugs. He also began working in larger-scale formats, producing large murals, stained glass windows, mosaics and tapestries.

Ceiling of the Paris Opera (1963)

In 1963, Chagall was commissioned to paint the new ceiling for the Paris Opera (Palais Garnier), a majestic 19th-century building and national monument. André Malraux, France's Minister of Culture wanted something unique and decided Chagall would be the ideal artist. However, this choice of artist caused controversy: some objected to having a Russian Jew decorate a French national monument; others disliked the ceiling of the historic building being painted by a modern artist. Some magazines wrote condescending articles about Chagall and Malraux, about which Chagall commented to one writer:

Nonetheless, Chagall continued the project, which took the 77-year-old artist a year to complete. The final canvas was nearly 2,400 square feet (220 sq. meters) and required  of paint. It had five sections which were glued to polyester panels and hoisted up to the  ceiling. The images Chagall painted on the canvas paid tribute to the composers Mozart, Wagner, Mussorgsky, Berlioz and Ravel, as well as to famous actors and dancers.

It was presented to the public on 23 September 1964 in the presence of Malraux and 2,100 invited guests. The Paris correspondent for the New York Times wrote, "For once the best seats were in the uppermost circle: Baal-Teshuva writes:

After the new ceiling was unveiled, "even the bitterest opponents of the commission seemed to fall silent", writes Baal-Teshuva. "Unanimously, the press declared Chagall's new work to be a great contribution to French culture." Malraux later said, "What other living artist could have painted the ceiling of the Paris Opera in the way Chagall did?... He is above all one of the great colourists of our time... many of his canvases and the Opera ceiling represent sublime images that rank among the finest poetry of our time, just as Titian produced the finest poetry of his day." In Chagall's speech to the audience he explained the meaning of the work:

Art styles and techniques

Color

According to Cogniat, in all Chagall's work during all stages of his life, it was his colors which attracted and captured the viewer's attention. During his earlier years his range was limited by his emphasis on form and his pictures never gave the impression of painted drawings. He adds, "The colors are a living, integral part of the picture and are never passively flat, or banal like an afterthought. They sculpt and animate the volume of the shapes... they indulge in flights of fancy and invention which add new perspectives and graduated, blended tones... His colors do not even attempt to imitate nature but rather to suggest movements, planes and rhythms."

He was able to convey striking images using only two or three colors. Cogniat writes, "Chagall is unrivalled in this ability to give a vivid impression of explosive movement with the simplest use of colors..." Throughout his life his colors created a "vibrant atmosphere" which was based on "his own personal vision."

Subject matter

From life memories to fantasy
Chagall's early life left him with a "powerful visual memory and a pictorial intelligence", writes Goodman. After living in France and experiencing the atmosphere of artistic freedom, his "vision soared and he created a new reality, one that drew on both his inner and outer worlds." But it was the images and memories of his early years in Belarus that would sustain his art for more than 70 years.

According to Cogniat, there are certain elements in his art that have remained permanent and seen throughout his career. One of those was his choice of subjects and the way they were portrayed. "The most obviously constant element is his gift for happiness and his instinctive compassion, which even in the most serious subjects prevents him from dramatization..." Musicians have been a constant during all stages of his work. After he first got married, "lovers have sought each other, embraced, caressed, floated through the air, met in wreaths of flowers, stretched, and swooped like the melodious passage of their vivid day-dreams. Acrobats contort themselves with the grace of exotic flowers on the end of their stems; flowers and foliage abound everywhere." Wullschlager explains the sources for these images:

Chagall described his love of circus people:

His early pictures were often of the town where he was born and raised, Vitebsk. Cogniat notes that they are realistic and give the impression of firsthand experience by capturing a moment in time with action, often with a dramatic image. During his later years, as for instance in the "Bible series", subjects were more dramatic. He managed to blend the real with the fantastic, and combined with his use of color the pictures were always at least acceptable if not powerful. He never attempted to present pure reality but always created his atmospheres through fantasy. In all cases Chagall's "most persistent subject is life itself, in its simplicity or its hidden complexity... He presents for our study places, people, and objects from his own life".

Jewish themes
After absorbing the techniques of Fauvism and Cubism (under the influence of Jean Metzinger and Albert Gleizes) Chagall was able to blend these stylistic tendencies with his own folkish style. He gave the grim life of Hasidic Jews the "romantic overtones of a charmed world", notes Goodman. It was by combining the aspects of Modernism with his "unique artistic language", that he was able to catch the attention of critics and collectors throughout Europe. Generally, it was his boyhood of living in a Belarusian provincial town that gave him a continual source of imaginative stimuli. Chagall would become one of many Jewish émigrés who later became noted artists, all of them similarly having once been part of "Russia's most numerous and creative minorities", notes Goodman.

World War I, which ended in 1918, had displaced nearly a million Jews and destroyed what remained of the provincial shtetl culture that had defined life for most Eastern European Jews for centuries. Goodman notes, "The fading of traditional Jewish society left artists like Chagall with powerful memories that could no longer be fed by a tangible reality. Instead, that culture became an emotional and intellectual source that existed solely in memory and the imagination... So rich had the experience been, it sustained him for the rest of his life." Sweeney adds that "if you ask Chagall to explain his paintings, he would reply, 'I don't understand them at all. They are not literature. They are only pictorial arrangements of images that obsess me..."

In 1948, after returning to France from the U.S. after the war, he saw for himself the destruction that the war had brought to Europe and the Jewish populations. In 1951, as part of a memorial book dedicated to eighty-four Jewish artists who were killed by the Nazis in France, he wrote a poem entitled "For the Slaughtered Artists: 1950", which inspired paintings such as the Song of David (see photo):

Lewis writes that Chagall "remains the most important visual artist to have borne witness to the world of East European Jewry... and inadvertently became the public witness of a now vanished civilization." Although Judaism has religious inhibitions about pictorial art of many religious subjects, Chagall managed to use his fantasy images as a form of visual metaphor combined with folk imagery. His "Fiddler on the Roof", for example, combines a folksy village setting with a fiddler as a way to show the Jewish love of music as important to the Jewish spirit.

Music played an important role in shaping the subjects of his work. While he later came to love the music of Bach and Mozart, during his youth he was mostly influenced by the music within the Hasidic community where he was raised. Art historian Franz Meyer points out that one of the main reasons for the unconventional nature of his work is related to the hassidism which inspired the world of his childhood and youth and had actually impressed itself on most Eastern European Jews since the 18th century. He writes, "For Chagall this is one of the deepest sources, not of inspiration, but of a certain spiritual attitude... the hassidic spirit is still the basis and source of nourishment of his art." In a talk that Chagall gave in 1963 while visiting America, he discussed some of those impressions.

However, Chagall had a complex relationship with Judaism. On the one hand, he credited his Russian Jewish cultural background as being crucial to his artistic imagination. But however ambivalent he was about his religion, he could not avoid drawing upon his Jewish past for artistic material. As an adult, he was not a practicing Jew, but through his paintings and stained glass, he continually tried to suggest a more "universal message", using both Jewish and Christian themes.

He was also at pains to distance his work from a single Jewish focus. At the opening of The Chagall Museum in Nice he said 'My painting represents not the dream of one people but of all humanity'.

Other types of art

Stained glass windows
One of Chagall's major contributions to art has been his work with stained glass. This medium allowed him further to express his desire to create intense and fresh colors and had the added benefit of natural light and refraction interacting and constantly changing: everything from the position where the viewer stood to the weather outside would alter the visual effect (though this is not the case with his Hadassah windows). It was not until 1956, when he was nearly 70 years of age, that he designed windows for the church at Assy, his first major project. Then, from 1958 to 1960, he created windows for Metz Cathedral.

Jerusalem Windows (1962) 

In 1960, he began creating stained glass windows for the synagogue of Hebrew University's Hadassah Medical Center in Jerusalem. Leymarie writes that "in order to illuminate the synagogue both spiritually and physically", it was decided that the twelve windows, representing the twelve tribes of Israel, were to be filled with stained glass. Chagall envisaged the synagogue as "a crown offered to the Jewish Queen", and the windows as "jewels of translucent fire", she writes. Chagall then devoted the next two years to the task, and upon completion in 1961 the windows were exhibited in Paris and then the Museum of Modern Art in New York. They were installed permanently in Jerusalem in February 1962. Cogniat considers them to be "his greatest work in the field of stained glass", although Virginia Haggard McNeil records Chagall's disappointment that they were to be lit with artificial light, and so would not change according to the conditions of natural light.

French philosopher Gaston Bachelard commented that "Chagall reads the Bible and suddenly the passages become light." In 1973 Israel released a 12-stamp set with images of the stained-glass windows.

The windows symbolize the twelve tribes of Israel who were blessed by Jacob and Moses in the verses which conclude Genesis and Deuteronomy. In those books, notes Leymarie, "The dying Moses repeated Jacob's solemn act and, in a somewhat different order, also blessed the twelve tribes of Israel who were about to enter the land of Canaan... In the synagogue, where the windows are distributed in the same way, the tribes form a symbolic guard of honor around the tabernacle." Leymarie describes the physical and spiritual significance of the windows:

At the dedication ceremony in 1962, Chagall described his feelings about the windows:

Peace, United Nations building (1964) 

In 1964 Chagall created a stained-glass window, entitled Peace, for the UN in honor of Dag Hammarskjöld, the UN's second secretary general who was killed in an airplane crash in Africa in 1961. In 1967 he dedicated a stained-glass window to John D. Rockefeller in the Union Church of Pocantico Hills, New York.

Fraumünster in Zurich, Switzerland (1967) 

The Fraumünster church in Zurich, Switzerland, founded in 853, is known for its five large stained glass windows created by Chagall in 1967. Religion historian James H. Charlesworth notes that it is "surprising how Christian symbols are featured in the works of an artist who comes from a strict and Orthodox Jewish background." He surmises that Chagall, as a result of his Russian background, often used Russian icons in his paintings, with their interpretations of Christian symbols. He explains that his chosen themes were usually derived from biblical stories, and frequently portrayed the "obedience and suffering of God's chosen people." One of the panels depicts Moses receiving the Torah, with rays of light from his head. At the top of another panel is a depiction of Jesus' crucifixion.

St Stephan's church in Mainz, Germany (1978) 

In 1978 he began creating windows for St Stephan's church in Mainz, Germany. Today, 200,000 visitors a year visit the church, and "tourists from the whole world pilgrim up St Stephan's Mount, to see the glowing blue stained glass windows by the artist Marc Chagall", states the city's web site. "St Stephan's is the only German church for which Chagall has created windows."

The website also notes, "The colours address our vital consciousness directly, because they tell of optimism, hope and delight in life", says Monsignor Klaus Mayer, who imparts Chagall's work in mediations and books. He corresponded with Chagall during 1973, and succeeded in persuading the "master of colour and the biblical message" to create a sign for Jewish-Christian attachment and international understanding. Centuries earlier Mainz had been "the capital of European Jewry", and contained the largest Jewish community in Europe, notes historian John Man. In 1978, at the age of 91, Chagall created the first window and eight more followed. Chagall's collaborator Charles Marq complemented Chagall's work by adding several stained glass windows using the typical colors of Chagall.

All Saints' Church, Tudeley, UK (1963–1978) 

All Saints' Church, Tudeley is the only church in the world to have all its twelve windows decorated by Chagall. The other three religious buildings with complete sets of Chagall windows are the Hadassah Medical Center synagogue, the Chapel of Le Saillant, Limousin, and the Union Church of Pocantico Hills, New York.

The windows at Tudeley were commissioned by Sir Henry and Lady Rosemary d'Avigdor-Goldsmid as a memorial tribute to their daughter Sarah, who died in 1963 aged 21 in a sailing accident off Rye. When Chagall arrived for the dedication of the east window in 1967, and saw the church for the first time, he exclaimed "" ("It's beautiful! I will do them all!") Over the next ten years Chagall designed the remaining eleven windows, made again in collaboration with the glassworker Charles Marq in his workshop at Reims in northern France. The last windows were installed in 1985, just before Chagall's death.

Chichester Cathedral, West Sussex, UK 

On the north side of Chichester Cathedral there is a stained glass window designed and created by Chagall at the age of 90. The window, his last commissioned work, was inspired by Psalm 150; 'Let everything that hath breath praise the Lord' at the suggestion of Dean Walter Hussey. The window was unveiled by the Duchess of Kent in 1978.

America Windows, Chicago 

Chagall visited Chicago in the early 1970s to install his mural The Four Seasons, and at that time was inspired to create a set of stained glass windows for the Art Institute of Chicago. After discussions with the Art Institute and further reflection, Chagall made the windows a tribute to the American Bicentennial, and in particular the commitment of the United States to cultural and religious freedom. The windows appeared prominently in the 1986 movie Ferris Bueller's Day Off. From 2005 to 2010, the windows were moved due to nearby construction on a new wing of the Art Institute, and for archival cleaning.

Murals, theatre sets and costumes
Chagall first worked on stage designs in 1914 while living in Russia, under the inspiration of the theatrical designer and artist Léon Bakst. It was during this period in the Russian theatre that formerly static ideas of stage design were, according to Cogniat, "being swept away in favor of a wholly arbitrary sense of space with different dimensions, perspectives, colors and rhythms." These changes appealed to Chagall who had been experimenting with Cubism and wanted a way to enliven his images. Designing murals and stage designs, Chagall's "dreams sprang to life and became an actual movement."

As a result, Chagall played an important role in Russian artistic life during that time and "was one of the most important forces in the current urge towards anti-realism" which helped the new Russia invent "astonishing" creations. Many of his designs were done for the Jewish Theatre in Moscow which put on numerous Jewish plays by playwrights such as Gogol and Singe. Chagall's set designs helped create illusory atmospheres which became the essence of the theatrical performances.

After leaving Russia, twenty years passed before he was again offered a chance to design theatre sets. In the years between, his paintings still included harlequins, clowns and acrobats, which Cogniat notes "convey his sentimental attachment to and nostalgia for the theatre". His first assignment designing sets after Russia was for the ballet "Aleko" in 1942, while living in America. In 1945 he was also commissioned to design the sets and costumes for Stravinsky's Firebird. These designs contributed greatly towards his enhanced reputation in America as a major artist and, as of 2013, are still in use by New York City Ballet.

Cogniat describes how Chagall's designs "immerse the spectator in a luminous, colored fairy-land where forms are mistily defined and the spaces themselves seem animated with whirlwinds or explosions." His technique of using theatrical color in this way reached its peak when Chagall returned to Paris and designed the sets for Ravel's Daphnis and Chloë in 1958.

In 1964 he repainted the ceiling of the Paris Opera using  of canvas. He painted two monumental murals which hang on opposite sides of the new Metropolitan Opera house at Lincoln Center in New York which opened in 1966. The pieces, The Sources of Music and The Triumph of Music, which hang from the top-most balcony level and extend down to the Grand Tier lobby level, were completed in France and shipped to New York, and are covered by a system of panels during the hours in which the opera house receives direct sunlight to prevent fading. He also designed the sets and costumes for a new production of Die Zauberflöte for the company which opened in February 1967 and was used through the 1981/1982 season.

Tapestries

Chagall also designed tapestries which were woven under the direction of Yvette Cauquil-Prince, who also collaborated with Picasso. These tapestries are much rarer than his paintings, with only 40 of them ever reaching the commercial market. Chagall designed three tapestries for the state hall of the Knesset in Israel, along with 12-floor mosaics and a wall mosaic.

Ceramics and sculpture
Chagall began learning about ceramics and sculpture while living in south France. Ceramics became a fashion in the Côte d'Azur with various workshops starting up at Antibes, Vence and Vallauris. He took classes along with other known artists including Picasso and Fernand Léger. At first Chagall painted existing pieces of pottery but soon expanded into designing his own, which began his work as a sculptor as a complement to his painting.

After experimenting with pottery and dishes he moved into large ceramic murals. However, he was never satisfied with the limits imposed by the square tile segments which Cogniat notes "imposed on him a discipline which prevented the creation of a plastic image."

Final years and death
Author Serena Davies writes that "By the time he died in France in 1985—the last surviving master of European modernism, outliving Joan Miró by two years—he had experienced at first hand the high hopes and crushing disappointments of the Russian revolution, and had witnessed the end of the Pale of Settlement, the near annihilation of European Jewry, and the obliteration of Vitebsk, his home town, where only 118 of a population of 240,000 survived the Second World War."

Chagall's final work was a commissioned piece of art for the Rehabilitation Institute of Chicago. The maquette painting titled Job had been completed, but Chagall died just before the completion of the tapestry.
Yvette Cauquil-Prince was weaving the tapestry under Chagall's supervision and was the last person to work with Chagall.  She left Vava and Marc Chagall's home at 4 pm on 28 March after discussing and matching the final colors from the maquette painting for the tapestry. He died that evening.

His relationship with his Jewish identity was "unresolved and tragic", Davies states. He would have died without Jewish rites, had not a Jewish stranger stepped forward and said the kaddish, the Jewish prayer for the dead, over his coffin. Chagall is buried alongside his last wife Valentina "Vava" Brodsky Chagall, in the multi-denominational cemetery in the traditional artists' town of Saint-Paul-de-Vence, in the French region of Provence.

Gallery

Legacy and influence
Chagall biographer Jackie Wullschlager praises him as a "pioneer of modern art and one of its greatest figurative painters... [who] invented a visual language that recorded the thrill and terror of the twentieth century." She adds:

Art historians Ingo Walther and Rainer Metzger refer to Chagall as a "poet, dreamer, and exotic apparition." They add that throughout his long life the "role of outsider and artistic eccentric" came naturally to him, as he seemed to be a kind of intermediary between worlds: "as a Jew with a lordly disdain for the ancient ban on image-making; as a Russian who went beyond the realm of familiar self-sufficiency; or the son of poor parents, growing up in a large and needy family." Yet he went on to establish himself in the sophisticated world of "elegant artistic salons."

Through his imagination and strong memories Chagall was able to use typical motifs and subjects in most of his work: village scenes, peasant life, and intimate views of the small world of the Jewish village (shtetl). His tranquil figures and simple gestures helped produce a "monumental sense of dignity" by translating everyday Jewish rituals into a "timeless realm of iconic peacefulness". Leymarie writes that Chagall "transcended the limits of his century. He has unveiled possibilities unsuspected by an art that had lost touch with the Bible, and in doing so he has achieved a wholly new synthesis of Jewish culture long ignored by painting." He adds that although Chagall's art cannot be confined to religion, his "most moving and original contributions, what he called 'his message,' are those drawn from religious or, more precisely, Biblical sources."

Walther and Metzger try to summarize Chagall's contribution to art:

André Malraux praised him. He said: "[Chagall] is the greatest image-maker of this century. He has looked at our world with the light of freedom, and seen it with the colours of love."

Art market
A 1928 Chagall oil painting, Les Amoureux, measuring 117.3 x 90.5 cm, depicting Bella Rosenfeld, the artist's first wife and adopted home Paris, sold for $28.5 million (with fees) at Sotheby's New York, 14 November 2017, almost doubling Chagall's 27-year-old $14.85 million auction record.

In October 2010, his painting Bestiaire et Musique, depicting a bride and a fiddler floating in a night sky amid circus performers and animals, "was the star lot" at an auction in Hong Kong. When it sold for $4.1 million, it became the most expensive contemporary Western painting ever sold in Asia.

In 2013, previously unknown works by Chagall were discovered in the stash of artworks hidden away by the son of one of Hitler's art dealers, Hildebrand Gurlitt.

Theatre
In the 1990s, Daniel Jamieson wrote The Flying Lovers of Vitebsk, a play concerning the life of Chagall and partner Bella. It has been revived multiple times, most recently in 2020 with Emma Rice directing a production which was live-streamed from the Bristol Old Vic and then made available for on-demand viewing,  in partnership with theaters around the world. This production had Marc Antolin in the role of Chagall and Audrey Brisson playing Bella Chagall; produced during the COVID epidemic, it required the entire crew to quarantine together to make the live performance and broadcast possible.

Exhibitions and tributes

During his lifetime, Chagall received several honors:
 In 1960, Brandeis University awarded Marc Chagall an honorary degree in Laws, at its 9th Commencement.
 In 1977, the city of Jerusalem bestowed upon him the Yakir Yerushalayim (Worthy Citizen of Jerusalem) award.
 Also in 1977, the government of France awarded him its highest honour, the Grand-Croix de la Legion d'honneur.
 1974: Member of the Royal Academy of Science, Letters and Fine Arts of Belgium.
1963 documentary
Chagall, a short 1963 documentary, features Chagall. It won the 1964 Academy Award for Best Short Subject Documentary.

Postage stamp tributes
Because of the international acclaim he enjoyed and the popularity of his art, a number of countries have issued commemorative stamps in his honor depicting examples from his works. In 1963 France issued a stamp of his painting, The Married Couple of the Eiffel Tower. In 1969, Israel produced a stamp depicting his King David painting. In 1973 Israel released a 12-stamp set with images of the stained-glass windows that he created for the Hadassah Hebrew University Medical Center Synagogue; each window was made to signify one of the "Twelve Tribes of Israel".

In 1987, as a tribute to recognize the centennial of his birth in Belarus, seven nations engaged in a special omnibus program and released postage stamps in his honor. The countries which issued the stamps included Antigua & Barbuda, Dominica, The Gambia, Ghana, Sierra Leone and Grenada, which together produced 48 stamps and 10 souvenir sheets. Although the stamps all portray his various masterpieces, the names of the artwork are not listed on the stamps.

Exhibitions
There were also several major exhibitions of Chagall's work during his lifetime and following his death.
 In 1967, the Louvre in Paris exhibited 17 large-scale paintings and 38 gouaches, under the title of "Message Biblique", which he donated to the nation of France on condition that a museum was to be built for them in Nice. In 1969 work began on the museum, named Musée National Message Biblique Marc Chagall. It was completed and inaugurated on 7 July 1973, on Chagall's birthday. Today it contains monumental paintings on biblical themes, three stained-glass windows, tapestries, a large mosaic and numerous gouaches for the "Bible series."
 From 1969 to 1970, the Grand Palais in Paris held the largest Chagall exhibition to date, including 474 works. The exhibition was called "Hommage a Marc Chagall", was opened by the French President and "proved an enormous success with the public and critics alike."
 The Dynamic Museum in Dakar, Senegal held an exhibition of his work in 1971.
 In 1973, he traveled to the Soviet Union, his first visit back since he left in 1922. The Tretiakov Gallery in Moscow had a special exhibition for the occasion of his visit. He was able to see again the murals he long ago made for the Jewish Theatre. In St. Petersburg, he was reunited with two of his sisters, whom he had not seen for more than 50 years.
 In 1982, the Moderna Museet in Stockholm, Sweden organized a retrospective exhibition which later traveled to Denmark.
 In 1985, the Royal Academy in London presented a major retrospective which later traveled to Philadelphia. Chagall was too old to attend the London opening and died a few months later.
 In 2003, a major retrospective of Chagall's career was organized by the Réunion des Musées Nationaux, Paris, in conjunction with the Musée National Message Biblique Marc Chagall, Nice, and the San Francisco Museum of Modern Art.
 In 2007, an exhibition of his work titled "Chagall of Miracles", was held at Il Complesso del Vittoriano in Rome, Italy.
 The regional art museum in Novosibirsk had a Chagall exhibition on his biblical subjects between 16 June 2010 and 29 August 2010.
 The Musée d'art et d'histoire du judaïsme in Paris had a Chagall exhibition titled "Chagall and the Bible" in 2011.
 The Luxembourg Museum in Paris held a Chagall retrospective in 2013.
 The Jewish Museum in New York City has held multiple exhibitions on Chagall including the 2001 exhibit Marc Chagall:  Early Works from Russian Collections and the exhibit 2013 Chagall: Love, War and Exhile.
 Schirn Kunsthalle Frankfurt "World in Turmoil" with paintings from the 1930s and 1940s between 4 November 2022 to 19 February 2023.

Current exhibitions and permanent displays

 Chagall's work is housed in a variety of locations, including the 'Palais Garnier' (the Opera de Paris), the Art Institute of Chicago, Chase Tower Plaza of downtown Chicago, the Metropolitan Opera, the Metz Cathedral, Notre-Dame de Reims, the Fraumünster abbey in Zürich, Switzerland, the Church of St. Stephan in Mainz, Germany and the Musée Marc Chagall Nice, France, which Chagall helped to design.
 The only church in the world with a complete set of Chagall window-glass is located in the tiny village of Tudeley, in Kent, England.
 Twelve stained-glass windows are part of Hadassah Hospital Ein Kerem in Jerusalem, Israel. Each frame depicts a different tribe.
 In the United States, the Union Church of Pocantico Hills contains a set of Chagall windows commemorating the prophets, which was commissioned by John D. Rockefeller, Jr.
 Lincoln Center in New York City, contains Chagall's huge murals; The Sources of Music and The Triumph of Music are installed in the lobby of the new Metropolitan Opera House, which began operation in 1966. Also in New York, the United Nations Secretariat Building has a stained glass wall of his work. In 1967 the UN commemorated this artwork with a postage stamp and souvenir sheet.
 The family home on Pokrovskaya Street, Vitebsk, is now the Marc Chagall Museum.
 The Museum of Biblical Art, Dallas, Texas has one of the largest collections of Chagall works on paper, hosting continuously holding rotating Chagall exhibitions.
 The Marc Chagall Yufuin Kinrin-ko Museum in Yufuin, Kyushu, Japan, holds about 40–50 of his works.
 Marc Chagall's late painting titled Job for the Job Tapestry in Chicago.

Other tributes
During the closing ceremony of the 2014 Winter Olympics in Sochi, a Chagall-like float with clouds and dancers passed by upside down hovering above 130 costumed dancers, 40 stilt-walkers and a violinist playing folk music.

See also
 Apocalypse in Lilac, Capriccio
 I and the Village
 La Mariée (The Bride)
 Soleil dans le ciel de Saint-Paul (Sun in the sky of Saint-Paul)
 Bouquet près de la fenêtre (Bouquet by the Window)
 List of Russian artists
 List of Freemasons

Notes

References

Bibliography
 Antanas Andrijauskas, Litvak Art in the Context of the École de Paris. Library of Vilnius Auction, Vilnius, 2008. ISBN 978-609- 8014-01-3.
 
 Sidney Alexander, Marc Chagall: A Biography G.P. Putnam's Sons, New York, 1978.
 Monica Bohm-Duchen, Chagall (Art & Ideas) Phaidon, London, 1998. 
 Marc Chagall, My Life, Peter Owen Ltd, London, 1965 (republished in 2003) 
 Susann Compton, Chagall Harry N. Abrams, New York, 1985.
 Sylvie Forestier, Nathalie Hazan-Brunet, Dominique Jarrassé, Benoit Marq, Meret Meyer, Chagall: The Stained Glass Windows. Paulist Press, Mahwah, 2017.
 Benjamin Harshav, Marc Chagall and His Times: A Documentary Narrative, Stanford University Press, Palo Alto, 2004. 
 Benjamin Harshav, Marc Chagall on Art and Culture, Stanford University Press, Palo Alto, 2003. 
 Aleksandr Kamensky, Marc Chagall, An Artist From Russia, Trilistnik, Moscow, 2005 (In Russian)
 Aleksandr Kamensky, Chagall: The Russian Years 1907–1922., Rizzoli, New York, 1988 (Abridged version of Marc Chagall, An Artist From Russia) 
 
 Aaron Nikolaj, Marc Chagall., Rowohlt Verlag, Hamburg, 2003 (In German)
 Gianni Pozzi, Claudia Saraceni, L. R. Galante, Masters of Art: Chagall, Peter Bedrick Books, New York, 1990. 
 V.A. Shishanov,Vitebsk Museum of Modern Art – a History of Creation and a Collection 1918–1941, Medisont, Minsk, 2007.
 Jonathan Wilson, Marc Chagall, Schocken Books, New York, 2007 
 Jackie Wullschlager, Chagall: A Biography Knopf, New York, 2008
 Ziva Amishia Maisels & David Glasser, Apocalypse: Unveiling a Lost Masterpiece by Marc Chagall, Ben Uri Gallery and Museum, 2010
 Shishanov, V.A. Polish-language periodicals about Marc Chagall (1912–1940) / V. Shishanov, F. Shkirando // Chagall's collection. Issue 5: materials of the XXVI and XXVII Chagall readings in Vitebsk (2017–2019) / M. Chagall Museum; [editorial board: L. Khmelnitskaya (chief editor), I. Voronova]. – Minsk: National Library of Belarus, 2019. – P. 57–78. Russian language

External links

 Marc Chagall Unofficial website
 Marc Chagall Art website
 Marc Chagall's Famous Belarusians page on Official Website of The Republic of Belarus 
 55 artworks by Marc Chagall at the Ben Uri site
 Floirat, Anetta. 2019, "Marc Chagall (1887–1985) and Igor Stravinsky (1882–1971), a painter and a composer facing similar twentieth-century challenges, a parallel. [revised version]", Academia.edu.

 
1887 births
1985 deaths
People from Liozna District
People from Orshansky Uyezd
Belarusian Jews
Painters from the Russian Empire
Belarusian male painters
Artists from the Russian Empire
Soviet painters
Belarusian painters
20th-century French painters
20th-century male artists
French male painters
Jewish painters
Modern painters
Neo-primitivism
Russian avant-garde
Russian stained glass artists and manufacturers
Yiddish-language poets
Wolf Prize in Arts laureates
Ballet designers
Levites
Soviet Jews
Emigrants from the Russian Empire to France
French people of Belarusian-Jewish descent
School of Paris
Russian Freemasons
French Freemasons
Members of the Grand Orient of Russia's Peoples
Jewish School of Paris
Grand Croix of the Légion d'honneur
Members of the Royal Academy of Belgium
French tapestry artists
Emigrants from the Russian Empire to the United States
Honorary Members of the Royal Academy
Russian textile artists
Naturalized citizens of France